Callidrepana jianfenglingensis is a moth in the family Drepanidae first described by Y. Li, Y. Hu and M. Wang in 2014. It is found in Hainan, China.

References

Moths described in 2014
Drepaninae
Moths of Asia